Carlos Quiñónez may refer to:

 Carlos Quiñónez (footballer, born 1977), Guatemalan football midfielder
 Carlos Quiñónez (footballer, born 1980), Ecuadoran football wingback